(also written 2013 ND15) is an asteroid that is a temporary trojan of Venus, the first known Venus trojan.

Discovery, orbit and physical properties 

 was discovered on 13 July 2013 by N. Primak, A. Schultz, T. Goggia and K. Chambers, observing for the Pan-STARRS project. As of September 2014, it has been observed 21 times with a data-arc span of 26 days. It is an Aten asteroid and its semi-major axis (0.7235 AU) is very similar to that of Venus but it has high eccentricity (0.6115) and small orbital inclination (4.794°). With an absolute magnitude of 24.1, it has a diameter in the range 40–100 m (for an assumed albedo range of 0.04-0.20).

Trojan dynamical state and orbital evolution 

 has been identified as a Venus trojan following a tadpole orbit around Venus' Lagrangian point . Besides being a Venus co-orbital, this asteroid is also a Mercury crosser and an Earth crosser.  exhibits resonant (or near-resonant) behavior with Mercury, Venus and Earth.

Potentially hazardous asteroid 

 is not included in the Minor Planet Center list of potentially hazardous asteroids (PHAs) because its absolute magnitude is greater than 22.0, even though it comes to within 0.05 AU of Earth periodically. It approached Earth at 0.077 AU on 21 June 2016.

See also

Notes 

  This is assuming an albedo of 0.20–0.04.

References 
 

Further reading
 Understanding the Distribution of Near-Earth Asteroids Bottke, W. F., Jedicke, R., Morbidelli, A., Petit, J.-M., Gladman, B. 2000, Science, Vol. 288, Issue 5474, pp. 2190–2194.
 A Numerical Survey of Transient Co-orbitals of the Terrestrial Planets Christou, A. A. 2000, Icarus, Vol. 144, Issue 1, pp. 1–20.
 Debiased Orbital and Absolute Magnitude Distribution of the Near-Earth Objects Bottke, W. F., Morbidelli, A., Jedicke, R., Petit, J.-M., Levison, H. F., Michel, P., Metcalfe, T. S. 2002, Icarus, Vol. 156, Issue 2, pp. 399–433.
 Transient co-orbital asteroids Brasser, R., Innanen, K. A., Connors, M., Veillet, C., Wiegert, P., Mikkola, S., Chodas, P. W. 2004, Icarus, Vol. 171, Issue 1, pp. 102–109. 
 The population of Near Earth Asteroids in coorbital motion with Venus Morais, M. H. M., Morbidelli, A. 2006, Icarus, Vol. 185, Issue 1, pp. 29–38. 
 Asteroid 2013 ND15: Trojan companion to Venus, PHA to the Earth de la Fuente Marcos, C., de la Fuente Marcos, R. 2013, Monthly Notices of the Royal Astronomical Society, Vol. 439, Issue 3, pp. 2970–2977.

External links 
 Discovery MPEC 
  data at MPC
 List of Potentially Hazardous Asteroids (PHAs)
 
 
 

Trojan minor planets
Venus co-orbital minor planets
Minor planet object articles (unnumbered)
Venus-crossing asteroids
Earth-crossing asteroids
20130713